Henri Boutet  is  a French engraver and illustrator.  He was born in Sainte-Hermine (Vendée) in 1851, and died in Paris on 9 June 1919. He was nicknamed the "little master of corset" or the "painter of the midinette"

Biography
Boutet specializes in the 1890s in the production of etchings and drypoints representing women in negligee, in the style of "Parisian" and has had little success with an informed public. The print is in limited edition. With his growing reputation, Boutet launched his own publishing house and sold his productions to periodicals such as Le Frou-frou, L'Assiette au beurre, Le Pêle-Mêle, or artistic publications such as La Plume, L'Estampe originale, The modern print or even the Hundred Collection. It illustrates many almanacs (The Female Year), calendars, menus.

In 1902 he published "Les Modes Feminines du XIXe Siecle" which met with instant acclaim. His 100 drypoint etchings showed the development of fashion for each year from 1801 to 1900 - drypoint etching results in an image with intrinsic softness of texture. The illustrations were hand-coloured, with close attention to detail, and a treatment that showed his affection for the subject matter. This collection of original etchings was limited to an edition of 600 copies.

Works

Publications
L'Art moderne, 1882-1883
Autour des Parisiennes
Les Modes Feminines du XIXe Siecle, 1908
Les fils de Washington en France, 215 original lithographs, 1918
Le Coeur de Paris en 1915 : Tableaux de la guerre, 1916
L'Ame de Paris. : Tableaux de la guerre de 1914, 1915
L'année féminine (1895) : les deshabillés au théâtre, 1896
Les petits mémoires de Paris, 1908-1909
Autour d'Elles : Le Lever-Le Coucher, 1899

References

External links

 

1851 births
1919 deaths
People from Vendée
19th-century French engravers
19th-century French male artists
20th-century French engravers
20th-century French male artists
20th-century French lithographers
French poster artists
Members of the Ligue de la patrie française
Color engravers